Welcome to the World is a 1997 album by Psycho Motel.

Welcome to the World may also refer to:
 "Welcome to the World" (Noiseworks song), 1987
 "Welcome to the World" (Kevin Rudolf song), 2009
 "Welcome to the World" (T.I. song), 2010
 "Welcome to the World", by Ed Sheeran from his album =, 2022